Alan Kelly may refer to:

Alan Kelly (politician) (born 1975), Irish Labour Party politician
Alan Kelly (discographer) (1928–2015), Scottish physicist considered a pioneer and of discographers
Alan Kelly Sr. (1936–2009), Irish former footballer
Alan Kelly Jr. (born 1968), his son, Irish former footballer
Alan Kelly (drummer), musician
Alan Kelly (referee) (born 1975), football referee
Alan Rowe Kelly (born 1959), American actor, director, writer and producer